Caroline Desbiens  is a Canadian politician who was elected to the House of Commons of Canada in the 2019 election from Beauport—Côte-de-Beaupré—Île d'Orléans—Charlevoix as a member of the Bloc Québécois.

During the election 2019 election campaign, it was found that in 2013, Desbiens wrote on her Facebook page that the Charter of Quebec Values that was being proposed by the Parti Québécois government of the day should be supported even if it was not perfect. “Our daughters, grand-daughters and great-grand-daughters could have to wear a veil to go to the IGA for fear of going to prison in a few years,” In 2016, she praised far-right French politician Marine Le Pen for having the courage of her convictions on Facebook. “Whether one agrees or not or only partially with what Ms. Le Pen says, we need more people like her”. She later apolologized about it, expressing deep regrets.

Electoral record

References

External links
 

Bloc Québécois MPs
Members of the House of Commons of Canada from Quebec
Women members of the House of Commons of Canada
21st-century Canadian politicians
21st-century Canadian women politicians
Living people
Year of birth missing (living people)
People from Capitale-Nationale